South Granville High is a high school in Creedmoor, North Carolina, and is part of the Granville County Schools system.

History
South Granville High School was built in 1962 as a replacement high school for the already existing Creedmoor High (also located in Creedmoor; later known as the Creedmoor School).

Since the Supreme Court case of Brown vs. Board of Education, the schools of North Carolina worked to become integrated. In Granville County this did not become true until late 1969. The black high school of G. C. Hawley (est. 1936) located a mile away from South Granville became the junior high school in 1970 taking the grades of 5–8 and South Granville became the high school with grades of 9–12. Since 1964 the South Granville athletics has had a rivalry with J. F. Webb High School located at the northern end of Granville County in Oxford.

The school celebrated its 60th anniversary in 2022.

Renovations and additions
The school was originally a small building with a few hundred students in attendance, but additions were made to the school over the years, as more students moved into the area.

A new wing was added onto the back part of the building in the late 1980s. In 1992, the school added a new entrance to the building (containing a lobby, auditorium, band room, restrooms, and auxiliary gym). In late 1998, the county added another wing to the school on the south end of the building which housed more classrooms. The county decided in 2008 to add an addition to this wing. Along with the new addition, a newer entrance was added as an administration wing.

Notable events

2005 Mercury scare
In October 2005, South Granville was closed for three days after two students stole mercury from an unlocked cabinet. They allegedly passed it around and took it home, potentially exposing dozens to toxic mercury vapors. Health officials conducted air quality tests. Fourteen classrooms had mercury vapor levels higher than the recommended level by the Environmental Protection Agency. The officials recovered most of the mercury from the boy's house buried in his backyard. The two students were expelled from the school for the rest of the year, and the science teacher was suspended pending on board investigations (he was found innocent and retained his job). A month later, school officials said a student found a small amount of mercury in a boys' bathroom. Teachers placed the mercury in a bottle and turned it over to emergency management officials. Officials said air quality tests conducted that night revealed "no evidence of additional mercury at the school."

Overview and Ranking 
According to the data presented by the US News, South Granville High School is ranked 380th within North Carolina. Students have the opportunity to take Advanced Placement® coursework and exams. The AP® participation rate at South Granville High School is 37%. The total minority enrollment is 53%, and 33% of students are economically disadvantaged. South Granville High School is 1 of 6 high schools in the Granville County Schools.

South Granville High School is ranked #11,839 in the National Rankings. Schools are ranked on their performance on state-required tests, graduation and how well they prepare students for college.

All Rankings 

 #11,839 in National Rankings
 #380 in North Carolina High Schools
 #24 in Durham, NC Metro Area High Schools
 #2 in Granville County Schools High Schools

Student attendance
Total students (estimated) – 709
Student Demographics: 47% White, 27% Black, 20% Hispanic, 5% Two or more Races, .5% Asian, .5% American Indian

Sports
The sports program includes
Football
Basketball (Men & Women)
Cheerleading
Baseball
Soccer (Men & Women)
Wrestling
Softball
Tennis (Men & Women)
Cross Country
Track & Field
Golf (Men & Women)
Marching Band

Notable alumni
 Linda L. Bray  former U.S. Army officer known for being the first woman in the United States military to lead troops into combat
 Matt Harrison  former Major League Baseball pitcher and All-Star in 2012
 William Jeffery Johnson  former Major League Baseball pitcher with the New York Yankees

References

External links
 

Educational institutions established in 1962
Schools in Granville County, North Carolina
Public high schools in North Carolina